The 2001 Clásica de San Sebastián was the 21st edition of the Clásica de San Sebastián cycle race and was held on 11 August 2001. The race started and finished in San Sebastián. The race was won by Laurent Jalabert of the CSC team.

General classification

References

Clásica de San Sebastián
San
Clasica De San Sebastian
August 2001 sports events in Europe